Last of the Conquerors is the 1948 debut novel by African-American journalist and editor William Gardner Smith.

The novel concerns the author's experience as an African-American  GI serving in the racially segregated United States Army in US-occupied Germany after World War II. The protagonist, Hayes Dawkins, has an affair with Ilse, a white German woman. He and Ilse struggle against racist Army officers and policies to sustain a relationship that some white soldiers condemn (although there are also many friendly whites who help them).

Last of the Conquerors depicts post-Nazi Germany as more racially tolerant than the United States. While this depiction may or may not be accurate, Smith's novel is offering a critique of Marshall Plan rhetoric claiming that American society should be a model for the world, while African-Americans continued to suffer under the Jim Crow system at home and in the military (an inconsistency noticed by many other writers, American and German, at the time).

References

External links
Last of the Conquerors, Summary and Review (with image) zsheppard Storify

1948 American novels
African-American novels
Novels set in Germany
Novels set during World War II
Farrar, Straus and Giroux books
1948 debut novels